Peyto may refer to:
Peyto Lake
Peyto Peak
Peyto Glacier
Peyto Hut
William Peyto (disambiguation)